Bang Bang is the first studio album by South Korean girl group Dal Shabet, released June 6, 2012. "Mr. Bang Bang" served as the lead single.

Background 
Immediately following the end of promotions for their fourth mini-album, Hit U, Dal Shabet announced that they would be returning to the music scene in June of the same year. The group expressed, "We’re glad to have been able to show a different image than our previous ones with this comeback. We’ll be using the experience gained from our fourth mini-album for our next album.”

On May 23, 2012, it was formally announced that Viki, Dal Shabet's leader and rapper, would be departing from the group to pursue individual activities. It was announced the following day that Viki would be replaced with a long-standing Happy Face Entertainment trainee Bae Woo-hee (Woohee).

On May 27, 2012, it was revealed that the upcoming release would be Dal Shabet's first full-length album and would be titled Bang Bang. The music video to the lead single, "Mr. Bang Bang", was released on June 5, 2012.  The album was digitally and physically released the following day.

Composition 

The album consists of fourteen tracks; nine new songs, four previously released songs and one instrumental.  The four previously released singles contain Viki's vocals, while the nine new songs contain vocals from Woohee.

Happy Face Entertainment's owners, E-Tribe, contributed to the album by producing the promotional single, "Mr. Bang Bang", as well as the previously released singles. Fellow label mate, Nassun, who is credited as Beatamin, helped produce the intro track, as well as "Try to Come Closer (ft. Nassun)". Happy Face Entertainment hired the help of various "underground" producers, such as DK$HINE, DJ R2, Blacc Hole and Gentleman.

Promotions 
Dal Shabet initially promoted the album through the use of specially customized lamborghinis, which were driven around popular areas of South Korea, including Seoul.  One day prior to the official release of the album, Dal Shabet held their first ever comeback showcase in honor of their first studio album.   Official promotions began on June 7, 2012, on the music program M! Countdown, where the group held a special comeback stage, and performed "Enter Dal★Shabet (Intro)", "Try to Come Closer (ft. Nassun)" and "Mr. Bang Bang".

Track listing

Chart performance

Sales

References 

2012 albums
Dal Shabet albums
Stone Music Entertainment albums